Hovorea is a monotypic genus of beetle in the family Cerambycidae containing the single species Hovorea chica. It was described by Chemsak and Noguera in 1993.

References 

Cerambycinae
Beetles described in 1993
Monotypic beetle genera